Trichilia is a flowering plant genus in the family Meliaceae. These plants are particularly diverse in sub-Saharan Africa and tropical South America.

Several species are used in folk medicine and shamanism – e.g. T. rubescens against malaria, T. tocacheana as a hallucinogen, and T. catigua in the aphrodisiac and stimulant catuaba. T. emetica wood, also known as Natal mahogany or Cape mahogany is the traditional material of choice for Mozambique's famous psikhelekedana miniature artists. Trichilia dregeana, or forest mahogany also yields timber and is also used in carvings, traditional African musical instruments, household implements, furniture, bats and canoes.

Selected species:

 Trichilia acuminata
 Trichilia areolata
 Trichilia blanchetii
 Trichilia breviflora
 Trichilia bullata
 Trichilia casaretti
 Trichilia catigua
 Trichilia chirriactensis
 Trichilia columata Guardi
 Trichilia discolor
 Trichilia dregeana Sond.
 Trichilia elsae
 Trichilia emarginata
 Trichilia emetica Vahl
 Trichilia fasciculata
 Trichilia florbranca
 Trichilia gamopetala
 Trichilia grandifolia
 Trichilia hirta
 Trichilia hispida
 Trichilia lecointei
 Trichilia lovettii
 Trichilia magnifoliola
 Trichilia micropetala
 Trichilia ornithothera
 Trichilia pallens
 Trichilia pittieri
 Trichilia primogenita
 Trichilia pseudostipularis
 Trichilia pungens
 Trichilia quadrijuga
 Trichilia ramalhoi
 Trichilia reticulata
 Trichilia rubescens
 Trichilia silvatica
 Trichilia solitudinis
 Trichilia stellato-tomentosa
 Trichilia surumuensis
 Trichilia tetrapetala
 Trichilia tocacheana C.DC.
 Trichilia trachyantha
 Trichilia triacantha – Bariaco
 Trichilia ulei

References

External links

 
Meliaceae genera
Medicinal plants
Taxonomy articles created by Polbot